Persististrombus coronatus  is an extinct species of fossil true conch from the Late Miocene to Pliocene (11.6-2.58 million years ago).

Description
The large-sized light brown shells are heavy, very thick at the right edge, and show long protuberances. These molluscs were epifaunal omnivore-grazers. They lived in shallow water on sandy seabeds, in warm and tropical seas.

In the Miocene, the species is a West Atlantic element, which later invaded the Mediterranean region. It disappears from the Mediterranean Sea completely with the onset of the Late Pliocene cooling.

Distribution
During the early Pliocene warming, the species is recorded from Portugal, Spain, France, Italy, Greece, Turkey, Syria, Libya, Tunisia, Morocco and the Canary Islands. It is also present in the Miocene of Algeria, Greece, Libya, Romania, Somalia and Austria. It was also recorded from the Lower Pliocene of the Azores (Santa Maria Island).

References

 Biolib
 Stromboideea
 Paleobiology Database
 Pliocene italiano
 Harzhauser, M. & Kronenberg G.C., 2008. A Note on Strombus coronatus Defrance, 1827 and Strombus coronatus Roeding, 1798 (Mollusca: Gastropoda) The Veliger 50 (2

Strombidae